Wilson Hall is a historic dormitory building on the campus of Arkansas Tech University in Russellville, Arkansas.  It is located on the west side of North El Paso Street, just north of West M Street.  It is a large two-story brick building with Colonial Revival styling, consisting of a central block, from which symmetrical wings extend forward from its ends, ending in slightly wider "houses".   It was built in 1925, during a period of expansion in which the school, then the Second District Agricultural School, began offering four-year degree programs.

The building was listed on the National Register of Historic Places in 1992.

See also
National Register of Historic Places listings in Pope County, Arkansas

References

University and college buildings on the National Register of Historic Places in Arkansas
Colonial Revival architecture in Arkansas
School buildings completed in 1925
Buildings and structures in Russellville, Arkansas
Arkansas Tech University
1925 establishments in Arkansas